Ryan Shea (born February 11, 1997) is an American professional ice hockey defenseman currently playing for the Texas Stars as a prospect under contract with the Dallas Stars of the National Hockey League (NHL).

Playing career
Shea attended Boston College High School and played junior hockey with the Youngstown Phantoms of the United States Hockey League (USHL) before he was selected by the Chicago Blackhawks in the fourth-round, 121st overall, of the 2015 NHL Entry Draft.

Shea played collegiate hockey with Northeastern University of the Hockey East, and after completing his tenure with the Huskies he became a free agent after the Blackhawks exclusive right's expired. On August 19, 2020, Shea was signed to a two-year, entry-level contract with the Dallas Stars.

International play

 

Shea after completing his first professional season was added to the American national team to compete in the 2021 IIHF World Championship in Riga, Latvia. He collected 1 assist in 3 games for the United States, helping collect a Bronze medal in defeating Russia in the third place playoff.

Career statistics

Regular season and playoffs

International

Awards and honours

References

External links

1997 births
Living people
American ice hockey defensemen
Chicago Blackhawks draft picks
Ice hockey players from Massachusetts
Northeastern Huskies men's ice hockey players
People from Milton, Massachusetts
Texas Stars players
Youngstown Phantoms players